Yuko Gordon (née Hasegawa; ; born 23 February 1951) is a Japan-born Hong Kong long-distance runner who competed mainly in the marathon. She represented her country in that event at the 1984 Summer Olympics and the 1983 World Championships in Athletics. She holds a personal best of  2:38:32 hours, set in 1987.

Competing in the 1980s, she was the first international standard marathon runner from Hong Kong and was twice winner of the Macau Marathon, Hong Kong Marathon, and Bangkok Marathon. She was originally from Japan but opted to represent Hong Kong, (her adopted nation by marriage) and enjoyed international competition for the first time in her thirties.

She  was a silver medallist in the marathon at the 1985 Asian Athletics Championships, finishing behind India's Asha Agarwal.

She continued running in her later years as a masters athlete and won the women's under-45 category for the 5000 metres at the 1997 World Masters Athletics Championships.

On the 29th of September 2019, Yuko broke the world record marathon time in her single age category (68 year old) in the Berlin marathon with a time of 3:19:37.

International competitions

Road race wins
Macau Marathon: 1983, 1985
Hong Kong Marathon: 1983, 1984
Bangkok Marathon: 1987, 1988

See also
Neko Hiroshi, Japanese runner who competed for Cambodia

References

External links

Living people
1951 births
Hong Kong female long-distance runners
Hong Kong female marathon runners
Japanese female long-distance runners
Japanese female marathon runners
World Athletics Championships athletes for Hong Kong
Olympic athletes of Hong Kong
Athletes (track and field) at the 1984 Summer Olympics
Commonwealth Games competitors for Hong Kong
Athletes (track and field) at the 1982 Commonwealth Games
Hong Kong female cross country runners